Carrick McDonough (born 25 June 2002) is a Welsh rugby union player for Dragons in the United Rugby Championship. McDonough's primary position is wing.

Rugby Union career

Professional career

McDonough was named in the Dragons academy squad for the 2021–22 season. He is yet to debut for the Dragons, but has represented Wales Sevens at one tournament.

References

2002 births
Living people
Dragons RFC players
Rugby union wings
Welsh rugby union players